Boolboonda is a rural locality in the Bundaberg Region, Queensland, Australia.

History 
The name Boolboonda is reported an Aboriginal word created by local people to represent the sound of blasting to excavate the railway tunnel on the Mount Perry railway line which was built from 1882 to 1884.

Boolboonda Provisional School opened on 25 September 1882 but closed circa 1884. It reopened circa 1897, becoming Boolboonda State School on 1 January 1909. It closed on 9 February 1973. The school was located south of Tunnel Road.

Heritage listings
Boolboonda has the following heritage listings:
 Boolboonda Tunnel Road: Boolboonda State School
 Boolboonda Tunnel Road: Boolboonda Tunnel

Amenities 
Boolboonda Memorial Hall is at 3064 Gin Gin-Mount Perry Road.

References

Further reading 

 

Bundaberg Region
Localities in Queensland